William Soliman (born 15 February 1980 in Saint Denis, France) is a French basketball player who played 13  games for the France men's national basketball team in 2008.

References

French men's basketball players
1980 births
Living people
Sportspeople from Saint-Denis, Seine-Saint-Denis
Nanterre 92 players
21st-century French people